Didier Thimothée (born 25 June 1970) is a French former professional footballer who played as a forward for French Ligue 1 clubs Stade Malherbe Caen, AS Saint-Étienne, Montpellier HSC and LB Châteauroux between 1990 and 2001.

Career
Born in Paris, Thimothée began playing football in the youth system at CO Savigny. He signed his first professional contract with Stade Malherbe Caen, where he suffered a knee injury which limited his availability with the senior side. He made his Ligue 1 debut and scored his first league goal with Caen.

After his contract with Caen expired, Thimothée signed for Ligue 2 side Red Star F.C. where he played from 1992 to 1995. Next, he returned to Ligue 1 with AS Saint-Étienne. Thimothée followed this with an injury-plagued spell at Montpellier HSC before finishing his professional career playing in China.

References

External links
 
 

Living people
1970 births
Association football forwards
French footballers
Footballers from Paris
Ligue 1 players
Ligue 2 players
Swiss Super League players
Red Star F.C. players
Stade Malherbe Caen players
AS Saint-Étienne players
Montpellier HSC players
AC Bellinzona players
US Sainte-Marienne players